The World Is Yours is an early television series, making its debut on June 26, 1951, on several stations of the CBS television network in the eastern United States. This half-hour daytime program (4:30-5:30 p.m., EDT) was hosted from New York by naturalist and author Ivan T. Sanderson, and was broadcast Monday through Friday. 

Mr. Sanderson's assistant was "Patty Painter" (Patricia Stinnette) a model  and CBS employee who had posed for on-camera tests of CBS's color television system since 1946. The producer-director for the show was Frances Buss. The first episode of the series was sponsored by General Mills and included commercials for Betty Crocker cake mixes.

The World Is Yours was broadcast in the CBS field-sequential color system that was incompatible with existing black and white television sets, on which no picture would be visible. Only a small number of prototype color television sets existed on which the program could be seen. It was last broadcast on September 14, 1951.

References

External links

1951 American television series debuts
1951 American television series endings
CBS original programming
Television in the United States